Progress M-23 was a Russian unmanned Progress cargo spacecraft, which was launched in May 1994 to resupply the Mir space station.

Launch
Progress M-23 launched on 22 May 1994 from the Baikonur Cosmodrome in Kazakhstan. It used a Soyuz-U2 rocket.

Docking
Progress M-23 docked with the aft port of the Kvant-1 module of Mir on 24 May 1994 at 06:18:35 UTC, and was undocked on 2 July 1994 at 08:46:49 UTC.

Decay
It remained in orbit until 2 July 1994, when it was deorbited. The deorbit burn occurred at 14:44 UTC, with reentry occurring at 14:57 UTC. The mission ended at 15:09 UTC, when the VBK-Raduga 10 capsule landed.

See also

 1994 in spaceflight
 List of Progress missions
 List of uncrewed spaceflights to Mir

References

Progress (spacecraft) missions
1994 in Kazakhstan
Spacecraft launched in 1994
Spacecraft which reentered in 1994
Spacecraft launched by Soyuz-U rockets